Beder Meye Jyotsna is a Bengali television soap opera that premiered on  3 February 2019 to 17 January 2021.It is produced by Surinder Films and stars Ravi Shaw and Sneha Das.

Cast

Main Cast
Sneha Das / Mousumi Debnath / Sneha Das / Anindita RayChaudhury  as Jyotsna
Ravi shaw as Rajkumar Kanchan husband of Jyosna

Recurring
Monalisa Paul as Kamini 
Chaitali Chakraborty
Payel Piya Das as Mohini
Sayanta Modak as Bikram
Chandrayee Ghosh
Juiee Sarkar as Rani Rukmini (Deceased)
Priyam as King (Deceased)
Rupam Singha as Bodhaditto
Jasmine Roy as Poddini (Deceased)
Sayan Banerjee as Ranojoy (Deceased)
Swarnava Rith Sanyal as Young Rajkumar Kanchan (in flashback)
Sudipta Banerjee as Vishkanya (Deceased)
Idhika Paul as Lakkhi (Deceased)
Anamika Chakraborty as Queen of bird (Bangomi)
Sreelekha Mitra as Yogini
Ritwika Sen as Queen of fairy (Sadapori)

References

External links
 Beder Meye Jyotsna on MX Player

Bengali-language television programming in India
Sun Bangla original programming
2019 Indian television series debuts